The 1973–74 Buffalo Braves season was the fourth season for the expansion Buffalo Braves franchise in the National Basketball Association and its Atlantic Division.  It was the team's second season under head coach Jack Ramsay.  The team's official home arena was Buffalo Memorial Auditorium.

Bob McAdoo, who finished second in the NBA MVP Award voting, led the league in scoring; Ernie DiGregorio, who won the NBA Rookie of the Year Award, led the league in assists and free throw percentage, and every starter on the team was among the league's top ten in at least one statistical category.

The team finished third in the Atlantic Division and fourth in the Eastern Conference.  After three consecutive 60-loss seasons, the team made the NBA playoffs for the first time and became the youngest team to have ever done so in terms of average player age.  They lost in the first round of the playoffs to the eventual champions, the Boston Celtics.

Draft picks

Roster
{| class="toccolours" style="font-size: 95%; width: 100%;"
|-
! colspan="2" style="background:#e23b45; color:#fff; text-align:center;"| Buffalo Braves 1973-74 roster
|- style="background:#106bb4; color:#fff; text-align:center;"
! Players !! Coaches
|-
| valign="top" |
{| class="sortable" style="background:none; margin:0; width:100%;"
|-
! Pos. !! # !! Nat. !! Name !! Ht. !! Wt. !! From
|-

Roster Notes
 Forward Jim Garvin played in only 6 games before being waived in November.
 Both center Kevin Kunnert and guard Dave Wohl were later traded away to the Houston Rockets in February.

Regular season

McAdoo had an outstanding second season and led the league in scoring with 30.6 ppg. The Braves led the league in team scoring (111.60) but were last in team defense (111.8).  They totaled 427,270 in attendance in their 41 home games, ranking them 4th of 17 teams. The Braves played several home games at the Maple Leaf Gardens in Toronto, in order to expand their fan base into Canada. This season was the first of three consecutive scoring titles for McAdoo.  McAdoo also posted 15.1 rebounds per game and 3.3 blocked shots per game, which were each third in the league. It was the most recent time that one player averaged both 30 points and 15 rebounds in the same NBA season.  In addition to McAdoo, the Braves were led by Ernie DiGregorio, who became the second straight Brave (following McAdoo) to capture NBA Rookie of the Year honors by leading the league in assists with 8.2 per game. 1974 NBA Rookie of the Year DiGregorio earned the first of two NBA free throw percentage championships (90.2%) and led the NBA in assists (8.2).  That season DiGregorio set the NBA single-game rookie assists record (25), which still stands as unbroken (tied by Nate McMillan). Jim McMillan would finish fifth in the NBA in minutes played (3322) and tenth in free throw percentage (85.8%).  He also finished second on the Braves in scoring (18.6).  Heard went on to rank in the top ten in rebounds (11.7, 10th) and blocked shots (2.8, 6th) that season.  Randy Smith, who was third on the team in scoring with a 15.5 average, finished third in the league in steals (2.5/game).

October–November
In his October 9, 1973 NBA debut against the Houston Rockets, Ernie DiGregorio had 14 assists.  DiGregrorio had 17 points but it was a 25-foot basket with two seconds left in overtime by McAdoo, who had 31 points and 21 rebounds, that earned the Braves a 107–105 victory. An October 30 victory over the Seattle SuperSonics gave the Braves a half game lead over the Celtics in the Atlantic Division with a 6–4 record.  The Braves only won one of their next nine games. It came on November 14 when McAdoo set the franchise single game rebound record with 28 against the Atlanta Hawks.  That night, he also scored 31 points for the fourth game in a row. Two weeks later on November 28, the Braves lost when Pete Maravich, who entered the game in the second quarter and posted 42 points off the bench, led the Atlanta Hawks over the Braves by 130–106.

December–January
The Braves' December 12 game against the Celtics was played in Providence, Rhode Island, making it a homecoming game for DiGregorio, the former Providence Friar.  The Braves lost for the 20th consecutive time to the Celtics that night.  Following a December 30 loss to the Los Angeles Lakers, the Braves fell to a 16–22 record at the end of 1973 but began the New Year with a season high seven-game winning streak. Heard set a career high with 22 rebounds in game five of the streak on January 8.  The fifth game of the streak set a new franchise record for consecutive wins and gave the team 21 wins, which matched their total of the prior season. The resulting 23–22 record following the January 12 victory over the Capital Bullets gave them their first winning record since their 6–5 start. McAdoo, who would go on to finish second in the NBA Most Valuable Player Award balloting, represented the team in the January 15, 1974 NBA All-Star Game. By the end of the month the Braves had fallen back to a 26–29 record.

February–March
On February 1, the Braves traded Kunnert and Wohl to the Rockets for Goukas and Marin. The team then went 10–5 in February. On February 27, the Braves earned their first victory over the Boston Celtics after 22 defeats.  By late February, the team had the top scoring offense in the league.  They clinched their first playoff experience in a victory at a home game held at Toronto's Maple Leaf Gardens against the Portland Trail Blazers as McAdoo again had 28 rebounds as well as 29 points. The clinching game on March 10 was the Braves 74th game.   The team reached five games over .500 three times following their 40th, 41st and 42nd wins but lost the last three games of a five-game western road trip to conclude the season at 42–40. The team made the playoffs by finishing in 3rd place in the Atlantic Division.

Season standings

Record vs. opponents

Season schedule

|- bgcolor="bbffbb"
| 1|| October 9 ||Houston Rockets ||107–105 (OT)||1–0||Win 1
|- bgcolor="ffcccc"
| 2|| October 12 ||@ Boston Celtics ||112–118||1–1||Loss 1
|- bgcolor="ffcccc"
| 3|| October 13 ||Los Angeles Lakers ||122–125||1–2||Loss 2
|- bgcolor="ffcccc"
| 4|| October 16 ||@ New York Knicks ||91–117||1–3||Loss 3
|- bgcolor="bbffbb"
| 5|| October 20 ||Philadelphia 76ers ||116–110||2–3||Win 1
|- bgcolor="ffcccc"
| 6|| October 24 ||@ Milwaukee Bucks ||113–130||2–4||Loss 1
|- bgcolor="bbffbb"
| 7|| October 26 ||Cleveland Cavaliers (at Toronto, Canada) ||104–97||3–4||Win 1
|- bgcolor="bbffbb"
| 8|| October 27 ||@ Cleveland Cavaliers ||111–101||4–4||Win 2
|- bgcolor="bbffbb"
| 9|| October 28 ||@ Kansas City-Omaha Kings ||112–100||5–4||Win 3
|- bgcolor="bbffbb"
| 10|| October 30 ||Seattle SuperSonics ||105–103||6–4||Win 4
|-

|- bgcolor="ffcccc"
| 11|| November 2 ||@ Chicago Bulls ||97–107||6–5||Loss 1
|- bgcolor="ffcccc"
| 12|| November 3 ||Golden State Warriors ||121–124 (OT)||6–6||Loss 2
|- bgcolor="ffcccc"
| 13|| November 4 ||Chicago Bulls (at Toronto, Canada) ||95–101 (OT)||6–7||Loss 3
|- bgcolor="ffcccc"
| 14|| November 7 ||@ Seattle SuperSonics ||113–130||6–8||Loss 4
|- bgcolor="ffcccc"
| 15|| November 9 ||@ Portland Trail Blazers ||108–122||6–9||Loss 5
|- bgcolor="ffcccc"
| 16|| November 10 ||@ Golden State Warriors ||105–128||6–10||Loss 6
|- bgcolor="bbffbb"
| 17|| November 13 ||Atlanta Hawks ||121–114||7–10||Win 1
|- bgcolor="ffcccc"
| 18|| November 15 ||@ New York Knicks ||86–97||7–11||Loss 1
|- bgcolor="ffcccc"
| 19|| November 17 ||Detroit Pistons ||94–98||7–12||Loss 2
|- bgcolor="bbffbb"
| 20|| November 18 ||@ Capital Bullets ||112–101||8–12||Win 1
|- bgcolor="bbffbb"
| 21|| November 20 ||Phoenix Suns ||127–100||9–12||Win 2
|- bgcolor="bbffbb"
| 22|| November 24 ||Kansas City-Omaha Kings ||143–131||10–12||Win 3
|- bgcolor="ffcccc"
| 23|| November 27 ||Milwaukee Bucks ||110–115||10–13||Loss 1
|- bgcolor="ffcccc"
| 24|| November 28 ||@ Atlanta Hawks ||106–130||10–14||Loss 2
|- bgcolor="ffcccc"
| 25|| November 30 ||Capital Bullets ||113–121||10–15||Loss 3
|-

|- bgcolor="bbffbb"
| 26|| December 5 ||Portland Trail Blazers ||114–110||11–15||Win 1
|- bgcolor="ffcccc"
| 27|| December 7 ||New York Knicks ||108–113||11–16||Loss 1
|- bgcolor="ffcccc"
| 28|| December 9 ||Boston Celtics (at Toronto, Canada) ||114–118||11–17||Loss 2
|- bgcolor="bbffbb"
| 29|| December 11 ||@ Atlanta Hawks ||132–127 (OT)||12–17||Win 1
|- bgcolor="ffcccc"
| 30|| December 12 ||Boston Celtics (at Providence, RI) ||119–126||12–18||Loss 1
|- bgcolor="bbffbb"
| 31|| December 14 ||@ Cleveland Cavaliers ||102–98||13–18||Win 1
|- bgcolor="bbffbb"
| 32|| December 18 ||Cleveland Cavaliers ||100–93||14–18||Win 2
|- bgcolor="bbffbb"
| 33|| December 21 ||New York Knicks ||117–115||15–18||Win 3
|- bgcolor="ffcccc"
| 34|| December 22 ||@ Kansas City-Omaha Kings ||112–122||15–19||Loss 1
|- bgcolor="ffcccc"
| 35|| December 23 ||Capital Bullets (at Toronto, Canada) ||85–110||15–20||Loss 2
|- bgcolor="ffcccc"
| 36|| December 26 ||Boston Celtics ||123–125||15–21||Loss 3
|- bgcolor="bbffbb"
| 37|| December 29 ||@ Phoenix Suns ||120–108||16–21||Win 1
|- bgcolor="ffcccc"
| 38|| December 30 ||@ Los Angeles Lakers ||105–108||16–22||Loss 1
|-

|- bgcolor="bbffbb"
| 39|| January 1 ||@ Portland Trail Blazers ||120–119||17–22||Win 1
|- bgcolor="bbffbb"
| 40|| January 2 ||@ Seattle SuperSonics ||115–111||18–22||Win 2
|- bgcolor="bbffbb"
| 41|| January 5 ||@ New York Knicks ||111–110||19–22||Win 3
|- bgcolor="bbffbb"
| 42|| January 6 ||Atlanta Hawks (at Toronto, Canada) ||117–109||20–22||Win 4
|- bgcolor="bbffbb"
| 43|| January 8 ||Atlanta Hawks ||100–96||21–22||Win 5
|- bgcolor="bbffbb"
| 44|| January 11 ||Houston Rockets ||117–99||22–22||Win 6
|- bgcolor="bbffbb"
| 45|| January 12 ||@ Capital Bullets ||97–96||23–22||Win 7
|- bgcolor="ffcccc"
| 46|| January 13 ||Houston Rockets (at Toronto, Canada) ||112–121||23–23||Loss 1
|- bgcolor="bbffbb"
| 47|| January 18 ||Capital Bullets ||98–94||24–23||Win 1
|- bgcolor="ffcccc"
| 48|| January 20 ||@ Philadelphia 76ers ||112–129||24–24||Loss 1
|- bgcolor="bbffbb"
| 49|| January 22 ||Philadelphia 76ers ||119–109||25–24||Win 1
|- bgcolor="ffcccc"
| 50|| January 23 ||Milwaukee Bucks (at Madison, WI) ||88–114||25–25||Loss 1
|- bgcolor="ffcccc"
| 51|| January 25 ||Kansas City-Omaha Kings ||113–118||25–26||Loss 2
|- bgcolor="ffcccc"
| 52|| January 26 ||@ Atlanta Hawks ||122–132||25–27||Loss 3
|- bgcolor="bbffbb"
| 53|| January 27 ||@ Houston Rockets ||122–108||26–27||Win 1
|- bgcolor="ffcccc"
| 54|| January 29 ||Golden State Warriors ||121–128||26–28||Loss 1
|- bgcolor="ffcccc"
| 55|| January 30 ||@ Detroit Pistons ||96–111||26–29||Loss 2
|-

|- bgcolor="bbffbb"
| 56||February 3 || Philadelphia 76ers (at Toronto, Canada)||112–98||27–29||Win 1
|- bgcolor="bbffbb"
| 57||February 6 ||@ Philadelphia 76ers ||114–98||28–29||Win 2
|- bgcolor="bbffbb"
| 58||February 8 ||Chicago Bulls ||106–101||29–29||Win 3
|- bgcolor="bbffbb"
| 59||February 9 ||@ New York Knicks ||103–100 (OT)||30–29||Win 4
|- bgcolor="ffcccc"
| 60||February 10 ||@ Cleveland Cavaliers ||121–125||30–30||Loss 1
|- bgcolor="ffcccc"
| 61||February 12 ||New York Knicks ||93–100||30–31||Loss 2
|- bgcolor="bbffbb"
| 62||February 13 ||@ Philadelphia 76ers ||129–106||31–31||Win 1
|- bgcolor="bbffbb"
| 63||February 15 ||Detroit Pistons ||118–116||32–31||Win 2
|- bgcolor="ffcccc"
| 64||February 16 ||@ Capital Bullets ||92–101||32–32||Loss 1
|- bgcolor="bbffbb"
| 65||February 17 ||@ Houston Rockets ||135–118||33–32||Win 1
|- bgcolor="bbffbb"
| 66||February 19 ||Milwaukee Bucks ||145–109||34–32||Win 2
|- bgcolor="bbffbb"
| 67||February 21 ||New York Knicks (at Toronto, Canada) ||119–97||35–32||Win 3
|- bgcolor="ffcccc"
| 68||February 22 ||Boston Celtics ||109–116||35–33||Loss 1
|- bgcolor="ffcccc"
| 69||February 26 ||Los Angeles Lakers ||112–119||35–34||Loss 2
|- bgcolor="bbffbb"
| 70||February 27 ||Boston Celtics (at Providence, RI) ||122–104||36–34||Win 1
|-

|- bgcolor="bbffbb"
| 71||March 1 ||Boston Celtics ||110–94||37–34||Win 2
|- bgcolor="bbffbb"
| 72||March 2 ||@ Philadelphia 76ers ||103–99||38–34||Win 3
|- bgcolor="ffcccc"
| 73||March 8 ||Seattle SuperSonics ||117–123 (OT)||38–35||Loss 1
|- bgcolor="bbffbb"
| 74||March 10 ||Portland Trail Blazers (at Toronto, Canada) ||122–112||39–35||Win 1
|- bgcolor="bbffbb"
| 75||March 12 ||Phoenix Suns ||124–94||40–35||Win 2
|- bgcolor="ffcccc"
| 76||March 15 ||@ Chicago Bulls ||97–114||40–36||Loss 1
|- bgcolor="bbffbb"
| 77||March 16 ||Cleveland Cavaliers ||114–105||41–36||Win 1
|- bgcolor="ffcccc"
| 78||March 17 ||@ Detroit Pistons ||109–116||41–37||Loss 1
|- bgcolor="bbffbb"
| 79||March 21 ||@ Golden State Warriors ||115–102||42–37||Win 1
|- bgcolor="ffcccc"
| 80||March 22 ||@ Phoenix Suns ||119–126||42–38||Loss 1
|- bgcolor="ffcccc"
| 81||March 24 ||@ Los Angeles Lakers ||124–150||42–39||Loss 2
|- bgcolor="ffcccc"
| 82||March 26 ||@ Houston Rockets ||96–119||42–40||Loss 3
|-

Playoffs
In the 1974 NBA Playoffs the Braves were matched up against the Boston Celtics.  The Celtics had won 22 of 24 matches between the teams. However, the Braves had won the most recent two matches after 22 straight defeats, including 5 earlier that season. Through four games, the  series was even at two games apiece. However the Celtics would pull away with two more wins to take the series in six games.  With rookie DiGregorio and 2nd year McAdoo leading the way, the team became the youngest NBA playoff team (24.42, using data going back to 1952) based on average age weighted by minutes played. The 1977–78 Milwaukee Bucks (23.82) would surpass this record.  The Celtics went on to win the NBA championship in the 1974 NBA Finals.

In game 1, the Braves lost a 17-point lead as Dave Cowens led a fourth quarter rally despite five personal fouls. In game 2, the Braves evened the series 1–1 with a 115–105 victory despite balanced scoring by the Celtics who had three 20-point scorers: Jo Jo White had 27, Don Nelson had 21 and John Havlicek had 20. McAdoo had 23 and DiGregorio had 18 for Buffalo. The Braves led most of game 2 and held on for the victory. In game 3, the Celtics scored 39 first quarter points on their way to a 120–107 victory. Havlicek had 43 points (26 in the first half), and Cowens added 23 (17 in the first half). The Braves recovered from an early fourth quarter 10-point deficit to win game 4 104–102. The game had a frenetic final 15 seconds as McMillian lost the ball on a drive resulting in a game-tying fast break by the Celtics.  Then when a McAdoo shot rolled off the rim, McMillian tipped the ball in as time expired for the victory.  The Braves had rallied from an 84–74 deficit to tie the score at 98 largely on the performance of McAdoo.  In the game the lead changed hands 9 times, and the Braves outrebounded the Celtics 62–38, including 20–3 offensive rebounds (11 by McMillian). The Celtics won game 5 by a 100–97 margin.  Although McAdoo was held to 16 points on the night, the Braves led 89–85 with four minutes left. The Celtics won game 6 of the series when White sank two free throws after time expired in regulation play for a 106–104 victory. McAdoo had tied the score at 104 with 7 seconds left, but he fouled White at midcourt.

In the playoffs, Heard bettered his regular season 15.3 points and 11.7 rebounds averages with 16.8 points and 14.7 rebounds.  Likewise, McAdoo contributed 31.7 points and 13.7 rebounds.  McMillian contributed 14.5 points and 8.8 rebounds.  Following the season the team lost Bob Kauffman to the New Orleans Jazz in the May 20, 1974 NBA Expansion Draft.

Playoff Schedule

|- align="center" bgcolor="#ffcccc"
| 1
| March 30
| @ Boston
| L 97–107
| Bob McAdoo (29)
| Gar Heard (20)
| Ernie DiGregorio (8)
| Boston Garden14,300
| 0–1
|- align="center" bgcolor="#ccffcc"
| 2
| April 2
| Boston
| W 115–105
| Bob McAdoo (23)
| Bob McAdoo (20)
| Ernie DiGregorio (12)
| Buffalo Memorial Auditorium17,507
| 1–1
|- align="center" bgcolor="#ffcccc"
| 3
| April 3
| @ Boston
| L 107–120
| Bob McAdoo (38)
| Gar Heard (13)
| Ernie DiGregorio (8)
| Boston Garden14,656
| 1–2
|- align="center" bgcolor="#ccffcc"
| 4
| April 6
| Boston
| W 104–102
| Bob McAdoo (44)
| Jim McMillian (18)
| Ernie DiGregorio (11)
| Buffalo Memorial Auditorium18,119
| 2–2
|- align="center" bgcolor="#ffcccc"
| 5
| April 9
| @ Boston
| L 97–100
| Randy Smith (25)
| Gar Heard (16)
| Ernie DiGregorio (4)
| Boston Garden15,320
| 2–3
|- align="center" bgcolor="#ffcccc"
| 6
| April 12
| Boston
| L 104–106
| Bob McAdoo (40)
| McAdoo, Heard (15)
| Ernie DiGregorio (9)
| Buffalo Memorial Auditorium18,257
| 2–4
|-

Source: www.basketball-reference.com

Player stats

Awards and honors
 Ernie DiGregorio, NBA Rookie of the Year
 Ernie DiGregorio, led NBA in assists (663)
 Ernie DiGregorio, led NBA in free throw percentage
 Bob McAdoo led the NBA in scoring.
 Bob McAdoo All-NBA Team (2nd team)
 Bob McAdoo 1974 NBA All-Star Game

Transactions
Prior to this season the Braves had lost 60 games or more each year and failed to make the NBA Playoffs.  Over the course of the season, the team made a series of player transactions that were part of the résumé that earned Buffalo Braves General Manager Eddie Donovan the NBA Executive of the Year Award and put the team into the playoffs for the first time. Donovan's season bolstered his reputation as a wheeler and dealer.

The Braves drafted four players in the 1973 NBA Draft who played for the team during the 1973–74 season:  DiGregorio, Ken Charles, Mike Macaluso, and Jim Garvin. In addition, the team made two free agent signings.  On September 11, 1973, the team signed Paul Ruffner. On September 17, 1973, the team waived Dick Garrett and Bill Hewitt.  The other members of the 1972–73 team who were not traded or waived and did not play on the 1973–74 team were Howard Komives, Fred Hilton and Harold Fox. On November 24, 1973, the Braves waived Garvin.  On November 27, 1973, the team signed Lee Winfield.

Prior to the 1973–74 NBA season, Gar Heard and Kevin Kunnert were traded from the Chicago Bulls to the Buffalo Braves for John Hummer, a 1974 NBA Draft 2nd round pick and a 1975 NBA Draft 2nd round pick. Also before the season, the Braves also traded Elmore Smith to the Los Angeles Lakers for Jim McMillian. The trade of Smith, who had been the team's leading scorer and rebounder the prior year, was controversial at first.  Other trades during the season included the February 1, 1974, trade of Kunnert and Dave Wohl for Matt Guokas and 1973 NBA All-Star Jack Marin.

The Braves were involved in the following transactions during the 1973–74 season.

Trades

Free agents

Additions

Subtractions

References

External links
 Braves on Database Basketball
 Braves on Basketball Reference

Buffalo
Buffalo Braves seasons
Buffalo
Buffalo